Dick Fincher (September 27, 1927 – August 10, 2002) was an American politician. He served as a Democratic member of the Florida House of Representatives. He also served as a member for the 47th district of the Florida Senate.

Life and career 
Fincher was born in Rochester, New York. He served in the United States Army.

In 1963, Fincher was elected to the Florida House of Representatives, serving until 1966. In the same year, he was elected to represent the 47th district of the Florida Senate, serving until 1972.

Fincher died in August 2002, at the age of 74.

References 

1927 births
2002 deaths
Politicians from Rochester, New York
Democratic Party Florida state senators
Democratic Party members of the Florida House of Representatives
20th-century American politicians